Funny People is a 1977 Soviet comedy film directed by Mikhail Shveitser.

Plot 
The film takes place at a rehearsal of an unusual choir. The film tells the stories of funny singers.

Cast 
 Oleg Basilashvili as investigator Fedor Akimovich
 Vladimir Basov as deacon Avdiesov
 Albert Filozov as Ivan Ivanovich
 Leonid Kuravlyov	 as Denis Grigoriev
 Yevgeny Leonov as Alexey Alekseevich
 Avangard Leontiev	as 	holy father Kuzma
 Vyacheslav Nevinny	as Vasily Mikhailovich
 Boris Novikov as Pruzhina-Pruzhinsky, official in the choir
 Vladislav Strzhelchik as Pierre 
 Elena Solovey as Pierre's wife
 Viktor Sergachyov as Mikhail Ivanovich, Count

References

External links 
 

1977 films
1970s Russian-language films
Soviet comedy films
Films directed by Mikhail Shveytser
Mosfilm films
1977 comedy films
Films based on works by Anton Chekhov